Sobralia rosea, is a species of orchid native to Colombia, Ecuador and Peru.

References 

rosea
Flora of Peru